"Segregationist" is a science fiction short story by American writer Isaac Asimov.  The story was written in April 1967 and was first published in December in Abbottempo, a magazine produced by Abbott Laboratories, then later included in the collections Nightfall and Other Stories (1969), The Complete Robot (1982) and Robot Visions (1990).

Plot summary
The story depicts a future where robotic prosthetics for humans and artificially-created organic body-parts for robots (known as Metallos) are commonplace. Metallos have been granted equal status with 'normal' humans.

A man, who has been granted the right to long life (possibly immortality) by an official Board of Mortality, meets the surgeon who is to assist in the performance of heart replacement surgery on the man. The surgeon offers him a choice between a metallic or fibrous cyber-heart. The man stubbornly refuses the doctor's attempts to persuade him to accept a fibrous heart, saying that it's "weak," as compared to a metal heart.

Later, the surgeon remarks to a medical engineer that he would rather that humans and robots stick to being what they are instead of becoming similar. The engineer calls such talk "segregationist", to which the surgeon replies that he "doesn't care." At the end of the story, the surgeon is revealed to be a robot himself.

Reception
In 1969, Analog Science Fiction / Science Facts P. Schuyler Miller called it "a beautifully tricky little short-short." In 1970, The Magazine of Fantasy & Science Fictions Joanna Russ reviewed Best SF: 1968 "[i]t leans toward the obvious and toward stories which have one good, clear, conventional idea" counting "Segregationist" among them.

References

External links 
 
 "Segregationist" on the Internet Archive

Robot series short stories by Isaac Asimov
Works originally published in American magazines
1967 short stories
Works originally published in science and technology magazines
Segregation